David Robertson (July 9, 1841 – August 8, 1912) was an Ontario physician and political figure.

He was born in Esquesing Township, Halton County, Canada West in 1841, the son of Alexander Robertson, a Scottish immigrant, and Nancy Moore, a native of New England. Robertson studied at McGill College and graduated with an M.D. in 1864. He first practised medicine in Nassagaweya before moving to Milton. Robertson was a captain in the local militia and raised a company of volunteers that served during the Fenian raids. He owned a large amount of real estate, including a large farm. In 1867, he married Jennie S. Morse.

Political career
He served four years as mayor of Milton and eight years as treasurer for the board of education.

Henderson represented Halton in the Legislative Assembly of Ontario from 1879 to 1883 as a Liberal member, but was defeated in the 1883 election.

Electoral record

{{CANelec/source|Source: The Acton Free Press}}

References

External links 
 

1841 births
1912 deaths
Ontario Liberal Party MPPs
Physicians from Ontario
Mayors of places in Ontario
People from the Regional Municipality of Halton
McGill University Faculty of Medicine alumni